Baron Brain, of Eynsham in the County of Oxford, is a title in the Peerage of the United Kingdom. It was created on 26 January 1962 for the physician and neurologist Sir Russell Brain, 1st Baronet. He had already been created a Baronet, of Reading in the County of Berkshire, on 29 June 1954.  the titles are held by his youngest son, the third Baron, who succeeded in that year. He is a retired physician and a former Professor of Medicine at McMaster University, Canada.

Barons Brain (1962—)

   Walter Russell Brain, 1st Baron Brain (1895–1966)
  Christopher Langdon Brain, 2nd Baron Brain (1926–2014)
  Michael Cottrell Brain, 3rd Baron Brain (1928—)
 (1) Hon. Thomas Russell Brain (1965—)

The heir apparent and sole heir to the peerage is the present holder's son, the Hon. Thomas Russell Brain (born 1965).

Notes

References
Kidd, Charles, Williamson, David (editors). Debrett's Peerage and Baronetage (1990 edition). New York: St Martin's Press, 1990, 

Baronies in the Peerage of the United Kingdom
Noble titles created in 1962